Eva Magala (born 17 January 1974) is a Ugandan amateur golfer who is the current chairperson of the Uganda Ladies Golf Union as well as elected trustee for the East & Central Africa region for the All Africa Challenge Trophy (AACT).

Golfing career 
Magala was introduced to golf by her late husband and started playing in 1996. As a player, she plays under Uganda Golf Club and has represented Uganda as captain of the national Ladies Team in 2015.

Administratively, she serves as the chairperson of the Uganda Ladies Golf Union.

She has called on the government to revise the current education system in order for more attention to be paid to sports.

Tournament wins

Awards and recognition 
2018 - Uganda Sports Press Associations (USPA) Female Golfer of the year

References 

Ugandan female golfers
Amateur golfers
Golf administrators
1974 births
Living people